Blue is a 1994 album by guitarist Phil Keaggy, released on Epic Records. Blue was released in the mainstream market simultaneously with Keaggy's album, Crimson and Blue, which was geared to the Christian market. The most significant differences are the inclusion of three different songs (Keaggy's cover of the Badfinger song, "Baby Blue"; "All Our Wishes"; and "The Further Adventures of..." from the Revelator EP) and the exclusion of five songs from Crimson and Blue ("Love Divine," "Reunion Of Friends," "Stone Eyes," "I Will Be There," and "Nothing But The Blood.") In addition, several of the tracks on Blue are reworked.

Track listing
All songs were written by Phil Keaggy, unless otherwise noted.

 "Doin' Nothin'"  – 7:35 (shorter than the Crimson and Blue version) 
 "Don't Pass Me By" (Keaggy/Nichols)  – 3:47
 "Baby Blue" (Pete Ham)  – 5:37
 "All There Is to Know" (Keaggy/Madeira)  – 3:49
 "John the Revelator" (traditional)  – 8:02
 "World of Mine"  – 4:30 (shorter than the Crimson and Blue version) 
 "Everywhere I Look" (Phil Madeira) – 3:53 (shorter than the Crimson and Blue version) 
 "The Further Adventures of..." (jam with Glass Harp's John Sferra)  – 12:37
 "All Our Wishes"  – 3:22
 "When Will I Ever Learn to Live in God" (Van Morrison)  – 6:39
 "Shouts of Joy" (music by Keaggy, words by Ray Repp)  – 5:54

Personnel
 Phil Keaggy – guitars, lead vocals
 John Sferra – drums
 Wade Jaynes – bass
 Phil Madeira – Hammond B3, keyboards, background vocals 
 Lynn Nichols – guitar, background vocals
 Mike Mead – percussion, background vocals 
 Ashley Cleveland – background vocals 
 John Mark Painter – Mellotron, trumpet
 Jimmy A – background vocals 
 Bernadette Keaggy – background vocals
 Alicia Keaggy – background vocals
 Olivia Keaggy – background vocals
 Lynn Nichols – producer
 Bill Deaton – engineer, mixing
 JB – additional engineering
 The Dugout, Nashville, Tennessee – recording location
 Ben Pearson – photography

References 

1994 albums
Phil Keaggy albums
Epic Records albums